George Vaillant is the name of:
 George Clapp Vaillant (1901–1945), American anthropologist
 George Eman Vaillant (born 1934), American psychiatrist